Hexa-cata-hexabenzocoronene (hexabenzo[a,d,g,j,m,p]coronene) is a polycyclic aromatic hydrocarbon with the molecular formula C48H24. It consists of a central coronene molecule, with an additional benzene ring fused onto each ring around the periphery.

Hexa-cata-hexabenzocoronene has a contorted structure due to steric crowding among the benzene rings around the edge, analogous to the situation in benzo[c]phenanthrene.

See also
 Hexabenzocoronene

References

External links
 

Polycyclic aromatic hydrocarbons